Tyson (born October 2001)  is a bulldog that is famous for his ability to skateboard. He has appeared on numerous TV shows, including The Oprah Winfrey Show and Rob & Big, and has been featured on Internet video sites such as YouTube.  

His owner Jim Blauvelt says that the dog was self-taught, starting in Huntington Beach, California in 2001. He appeared in the two movies: Lords of Dogtown and Undiscovered in which his performance was considered to be "outstandingly gifted". When performing, he earns over $1000 a day.

References

External links
Video of Tyson skateboarding on YouTube
Official Tyson
A short commercial featuring Tyson, the Skateboarding Bulldog on YouTube
A home video of Tyson skateboarding down a ramp in Huntington Beach, CA on YouTube
Tyson preparing for his performance in the 2009 Rose Parade, alongside his pal Tillman, another skateboarding bulldog on YouTube
Tyson skating in 2012 on YouTube

Individual dogs